Allen Kerr (13 June 1906 – 28 November 1985) was a New Zealand cricketer. He played fourteen first-class matches for Auckland between 1941 and 1946.

See also
 List of Auckland representative cricketers

References

External links
 

1906 births
1985 deaths
New Zealand cricketers
Auckland cricketers
Royal New Zealand Air Force cricketers
New Zealand Services cricketers
North Island cricketers